Creole marble, also called Georgia creole or Georgia marble, is a marble from quarries in Pickens County, Georgia, United States. It is coarse-grained, displays a white or gray background while veins or clouds are black or dark blue. Based on the tone and coloring it sold as Light Creole, Medium Creole, and Dark Creole.

Creole marble has been used extensively in buildings and monuments in the United States.

Notable buildings with Creole marble
United States Capitol, Washington, DC
Marriner S. Eccles Federal Reserve Board Building, Washington, DC
John Adams Building, Washington, DC
One Georgia Center, Georgia
Carillon, Bok Tower Gardens, Florida

See also 
 Georgia Marble Company: a creole marble quarry

References

See also
Georgia Marble Company
Etowah marble
List of types of marble

Marble
Pickens County, Georgia